Bilećanka is a popular Yugoslav song written in 1940 in a political prison camp in Bileća during the authoritarian regime of Prince Paul. Lyrics were written by Milan Apih, a Slovene communist and teacher from Celje, who was imprisoned at the camp.

Lyrics

Slovene 

Sredi pušk in bajonetov, 
sredi mrkih straž
Se pomika naša četa 
v hercegovski kras.

Čuje se odmev korakov
Po kamenju hercegovskem
Heja ho, heja ho.
 

Daleč zdaj si domovina 
nas izgnali so
Ko da krivi smo zločina, 
ker te ljubimo.

Čuje se odmev korakov...

Vzeli materi so sina, 
ženi so moža
Lačna je doma družina, 
dosti je gorja.

Čuje se odmev korakov...

Že v Sibirijo gonili, 
brate so nekdaj
Pa je prišel konec sili, 
kje si zdaj tiran.

Čuje se odmev korakov...

Skoz pregnanstvo in trpljenje, 
skozi ječe mrak
Prišlo novo bo življenje, 
čujte mu korak.

Čuje se odmev korakov...

Ko brez pušk in bajonetov, 
prosta nam bo pot
Stopala bo naša četa, 
svobodi naprot'.

Čuje se odmev korakov...

Serbo-Croatian 

Sred pušaka, bajoneta,
straže oko nas,
tiho kreće naša četa
kroz bilećki kras.

Čuje se odjek koraka
po kamenju hercegovskom;
Hej, haj, ho!
Hej, haj, ho!

Daleko si zavičaju,
mi prognani smo,
prognaše nas zbog zločina
što te ljubimo.

Čuje se odjek koraka
po kamenju hercegovskom;
Hej, haj, ho!
Hej, haj, ho!

Osta majka bez svog sina
žena bez druga
pusta osta kuća njina
gorka sudbina.

Čuje se odjek koraka
po kamenju hercegovskom;
Hej, haj, ho!
Hej, haj, ho!

Već u Sibiru gonili
braću su nekad
Pa je stigao konac sili
gdje si, tiranine, sad?

Čuje se odjek koraka
po kamenju hercegovskom;
Hej, haj, ho!
Hej, haj, ho!

Kroz progonstvo i trpljenje,
kroz tamnice mrak,
dolazi nam novi život,
čujte mu korak.

Čuje se odjek koraka
po kamenju hercegovskom;
Hej, haj, ho!
Hej, haj, ho!

Bez pušaka, bajoneta
bude li nam poć
stupat će naša četama
slobodi nasuprot.

Čuje se odjek koraka
po kamenju hercegovskom;
Hej, haj, ho!
Hej, haj, ho!

English translation 

Midst of rifles, bayonets,
guards around us all,
silently  our troops are moving
‘Long Bileća stone.

Footfall echoing the distance
on the rocks of Herzegovina 
Heya, ho!
Heya, ho!

You're so far my homeland country,
we've been sent away,
they deported us for crime of
loving you today.

Footfall echoing the distance...

Son from mother torn and lost,
husband from the wife,
Family at home grows hungry
Bitter fate awaits.

Footfall echoing the distance...

Already into Siberia,
brothers driven were,
but the plight that to has ended 
where ‘re you tyrant now?

Footfall echoing the distance...

Through the suffering, persecution
through the dungeon's dark,
a new life will be arriving
hear her footsteps mark.

Footfall echoing the distance...

As the rifles, bayonets,
Needed are no more,
Our company’ll be marching 
Facing freedom on.

Footfall echoing the distance...

References 

Yugoslav Partisan songs
1940 songs